General elections were held in Barbados on 21 February 2013. They were the first post-independence elections where the election date was announced five years after the last general election. The ruling Democratic Labour Party was re-elected with a reduced majority, winning 16 of the 30 seats in the House of Assembly.

Background 
According to the Constitution of Barbados, elections must take place no longer than every five years from the first sitting of Parliament. The last general election was held on 15 January 2008, while the first sitting of the current session of Parliament was held on 12 February 2008. After the dissolution of Parliament, the Governor-General of Barbados, on behalf of the Crown in Right of Barbados, must issue a writ for a general election for members to the House of Assembly and for appointment of Senators to the Senate within 90 days.

The election and nomination dates were announced by Prime Minister Freundel Stuart on 29 January 2013. The nomination deadline for candidates to register was scheduled for 6 February 2013.

Results

See also 
List of parliamentary constituencies of Barbados

References

External links 
Election results, By Nation newspaper
Election results, Voice of Barbados

Elections in Barbados
2013 in Barbados
Barbados
February 2013 events in North America